Kelly Olivia Gale (born 14 May 1995) is a Swedish model of Indian and Australian descent. Gale is known globally for her work for Victoria's Secret, the Sports Illustrated Swimsuit Issue, and Playboy, as well as being featured in the music video of "Duele el Corazón" by Enrique Iglesias.

Early life
Gale was born and raised in Gothenburg, Sweden. She also lived in Ghana for four years, and in Australia. Her mother Gita (who is a dentist and former pilot) was born in Pune, Maharashtra, India and was adopted by a Swedish family at age 5. Kelly's father Jeff is a photographer and former footballer from Tatura, Victoria, Australia. Gale has two younger brothers.

Gale has been involved in sports since an early age. She played soccer with Näsets SK in Gothenburg and tennis since she was seven years old. She attended Näsetskolan and Göteborgs Högre Samskola.

At age 13, she was discovered by a model agent outside a coffee shop in Gothenburg. Initially, Gale's parents were opposed to her working as a model but she eventually started modeling one year later. One of her first modelling jobs was for H&M.

Career
Gale's first big fashion show was Chanel in 2012.

In 2013, she was chosen to walk the Victoria's Secret Fashion Show for the first time, she has since walked the show in 2014, 2016, 2017 and 2018.

Gale has been in adverts and catalogues of H&M and H-I-G-H. She has walked runways for Azzedine Alaia, Chanel, Monique Lhuillier, Tommy Hilfiger, Band of Outsiders, Narciso Rodriguez, Badgley Mischka, Vivienne Tam, Ralph Lauren, Christopher Kane, Reem Acra, Tom Ford, Jean Paul Gaultier, John Galliano, Academy of Arts, Diane von Fürstenberg, Nanette Lepore, L'Wren Scott, Thomas Tait, Houghton, Rag & Bone and Victoria's Secret.

She has been featured on the cover of French Revue des Modes, and on editorials of Teen Vogue, Vogue Italia, Elle, Vogue India and Lucky.

In 2016, Gale was the Playboy Playmate of the Month for September 2016.

Gale leads a healthy lifestyle, paying particular attention to the type of food she eats. She trains for 2–3 hours each day and ramps up the tempo in the weeks prior to the Victoria's Secret Fashion Show. Her fitness regime includes power walking, jogging, boxing, and yoga.

Personal life
Gale was in a long-term relationship with a Swedish business manager, Johannes Jarl. As of early 2019, she has been in a relationship with Swedish actor Joel Kinnaman. She became engaged to Kinnaman in January 2021.

References

External links

Living people
1995 births
People from Gothenburg
2010s Playboy Playmates
Australian female models
Australian people of Indian descent
Female models of Indian descent
Ford Models models
Swedish female models
Swedish people of Australian descent
Swedish people of Indian descent
Swedish YouTubers